Pyze is an American company that provides AI Driven Process Intelligence, headquartered in Redwood City, California.  Pyze is the leading Digital Transformation analytics platform to maximize process efficiency and user productivity through integrated process mining and usage analytics. Pyze auto-discovers complex end-to-end business process flows to surface process bottlenecks, activity hotspots, and user experience optimization opportunities. Pyze enables continuous improvement across multi-platform workflows by automatically identifying insights to optimize efficiency and a data-driven methodology to maximize ROI and Business impact, regardless of the underlying technologies.

History 
Pyze was founded in 2014 by John Chisholm, Dickey Singh and Prabhjot Singh. The company initially developed a behavioral analytics and marketing platform to help app publishers monetize their apps and retain users. The company exited stealth mode in March 2016 and announced a $1.7 million seed round. The company launched its free platform in March 2016 and its Hypergrowth Tier in August 2016. In July 2019, Pyze raised $4.6 million in funding to expand its platform for AI-driven user analytics and process intelligence platform to Enterprise customers, specifically focusing on automated process optimization and decisioning to improve business outcomes.

Services 
Pyze enables success of Digital Transformation projects thru optimization and automation of any end-to-end business process that traverses multiple complex platforms to improve workflow orchestration, reduce costs and increase execution speed.

References

External links 
 Official site

2013 establishments in California
Mobile technology companies
Software companies established in 2013
Companies based in Redwood City, California
Software companies based in the San Francisco Bay Area
Software companies of the United States